Terry Reynolds (27 Jan 1948 – 18 Oct 2007) was an Australian professional rugby league footballer who played in the 1960s and 1970s. He played for the Canterbury Bulldogs, Parramatta Eels and for the New South Wales Rugby League team.

A brother of Bulldogs first-grader Barry Reynolds, he joined Canterbury in 1966 when the Berries (as they were then known) were building up after a long period in the doldrums to become a major NSWRFL force for the first time since the 1940s. It was 1968 before Terry played first grade, but by the beginning of 1970 he had permanently replaced Ross Kidd as first grade halfback and was established as one of the best in the game and that season he played for New South Wales and later for a World Cup selection trial.

However, Reynolds’ speed and skill at halfback was already overshadowed by his flamboyant behaviour on the field – the Berries suspended him because he would not cut his long hair but he had it partly cut and was reinstated, playing with a headband. After further trouble in 1971 – during which season Reynolds had the distinction of potting the first one-point field goal in first grade – it was clear Reynolds would leave the Bulldogs.

North Sydney were originally considered likely to secure him, but by October it was clear he would go to Parramatta. Reynolds eventually debuted for the Eels in 1973, but faced competition from John Kolc, Kevin Hogan and latterly former South Sydney star Denis Pittard. Often playing five-eighth with Kolc at halfback, Reynolds rendered valuable service to the Eels as they struggled in 1973 and 1974, but back at halfback became renowned for working many tryscoring moves down the blindside with lock Quayle as the Eels began their sudden rise to prominence in 1975. Persistent injuries caused him to retire before the 1976 season began.

External links

1947 births
2007 deaths
Australian rugby league players
Parramatta Eels players
Canterbury-Bankstown Bulldogs players
New South Wales rugby league team players
Rugby league five-eighths
Rugby league halfbacks